Playground Games Limited is a British video game developer based in Leamington Spa, England. It is known for developing the Forza Horizon series, which is part of the larger Forza franchise. In 2018, Playground Games became part of Microsoft Studios (now known as Xbox Game Studios). They are also developing the next game in the Fable series.

History 
Playground Games was founded by Gavin Raeburn, Trevor Williams and Ralph Fulton; the studio was announced in November 2009, with its opening scheduled for early 2010. Playground Games announced their first project, Forza Horizon, in 2012. The title was developed in collaboration with Turn 10 Studios and published by Microsoft Studios for Xbox 360 in October that year. The studio released Forza Horizon 2 on Xbox 360 and Xbox One in September 2014, and Forza Horizon 3 on Xbox One and Microsoft Windows in September 2016.

In February 2014, Playground Games announced that they were forming a new development team focused on mobile games. In February 2017, the studio detailed plans to open a second studio, focusing on a non-racing open-world video game project. In November, they announced they had leased St. Albans House in Leamington Spa, which would provide the new studio with more than 17,000 square feet of office space. Expected headcounts for both studios were in excess of 200 people.

At E3 2018, Microsoft announced they had acquired Playground Games, which became part of Microsoft Studios (now known as Xbox Game Studios). At the same time, Microsoft Studios also announced Forza Horizon 4, which would be released on 2 October 2018, and that the studio was working on an unannounced AAA Open-World Action RPG project, later revealed to be in the Fable franchise.

In January 2022, it was reported that co-founder and studio director Gavin Raeburn left Playground Games, while GM Trevor Williams replaced him as studio head.

Games developed

References

External links 
 

2010 establishments in England
2018 mergers and acquisitions
British companies established in 2010
British subsidiaries of foreign companies
Companies based in Leamington Spa
First-party video game developers
Forza
Microsoft subsidiaries
Video game companies established in 2010
Video game companies of the United Kingdom
Video game development companies
Xbox Game Studios